The Ms. Hockey Award is an award given to the best female senior high school hockey player in the state of Minnesota. The award is sponsored by the Let's Play Hockey newspaper, the Minnesota Wild, and Shakopee Chevrolet. The 2022 award winner was Vivian Jungels, a defender from Edina High School.

Criteria
The following are all criteria for the award: 
Academic record
Community service
Coachability
On-ice performance.

Selection process
The process of selecting the winner starts with the selection of the top 10 candidates in the state. This is reduced to five finalists, and then the panel selects a winner.

The panel responsible for selecting the winner consist of the following:
High school coaches
Division I and III college coaches from Minnesota and Wisconsin

Winners

The following table lists the winners of the Minnesota Ms. Hockey award.

Let’s Play Hockey Senior Goalie of the Year

The following table lists the winners of the Let's Play Hockey Senior Goalie of the Year.

Olympians
The following Ms. Hockey winners went to represent USA Hockey in the Winter Olympic Games.

References

American ice hockey trophies and awards
Ice hockey in Minnesota
High school ice hockey in the United States